The Companies Act 1907 (7 Edw.7 c.50) was an Act of the Parliament of the United Kingdom regulating UK company law, whose descendant is the Companies Act 2006.

Reforms
One reform made by the 1907 Act was to introduce explicitly a separate set of provisions for "private companies", which stood in opposition to "public companies".

References

See also
Companies Act
UK company law
History of companies

United Kingdom company law
United Kingdom Acts of Parliament 1907